The 1899 USFSA Football Championship was the 6th staging of the USFSA Football Championship. The Parisian clubs do not participate, arguing that Le Havre AC had not been crowned champion of its region. But still, Havre played and after beating Iris Club Lillois in the semi-finals they were proclaimed champions as Club français, a club from Paris refused to play the final.

Tournament

Semifinals
 Le Havre AC 1-0 Iris Club Lillois

Final
Club français refused to play in the final, so the USFSA awarded Le Havre AC the French championship.

References

External links
RSSF

USFSA Football Championship
1
France